Frank Ward (born 23 July 1930) is an Irish cyclist. He won the Rás Tailteann in 1957.

Early life
Ward is a native of Dublin.

Career
Ward won the Junior Men's race at the 1952 Irish National Cycling Championships.

Ward was second in the 1956 Rás and won it in 1957. That year, he also won three stages (of eight) and was on the winning Dublin team. He also won the 1957 Rás Cathal Brugha.

References

Irish male cyclists
1930 births
Rás Tailteann winners
Sportspeople from Dublin (city)
Living people